Asiadapis is a genus of adapiform primate that lived in India's Cambay Shale Formation during the early Eocene (Ypresian). It has two known species, Asiadapis cambayensis and Asiadapis tapiensis.

References

Prehistoric strepsirrhines
Eocene primates
Eocene mammals of Asia
Prehistoric primate genera
Fossil taxa described in 2007